Aniya  is a village and a gram panchayat in Chanditala I community development block of Srirampore subdivision in Hooghly district in the Indian state of West Bengal.

Geography

Gram panchayat
Villages in Ainya gram panchayat are: Akuni, Aniya, Bandpur, Banipur, Bara Choughara, Dudhkanra, Ganeshpur, Goplapur, Jiara, Kalyanbati, Mukundapur, Sadpur and Shyamsundarpur.

Demographics
As per 2011 Census of India Aniya had a total population of 3,281 of which 1,588 (48%) were males and 1693 (52%) were females. Population below 6 years was 322. The total number of literates in Aniya was 2,477 (83.71% of the population over 6 years).

Healthcare
Akuni Ichhapasar Rural Hospital at Aniya functions with 30 beds.

Transport
Bargachia railway station and Baruipara railway station are the nearest railway stations.

References 

Villages in Chanditala I CD Block